The University Club of San Francisco is a private social club located atop Nob Hill in San Francisco, California. Notable members have included President Herbert Hoover and conservationist John Muir.

History
The University Club of San Francisco was founded in 1890 by William Thomas, an alumnus of Harvard University (class of 1873) and the President of the Harvard Club of San Francisco.  Thomas wished to have a club that would accept alumni of more universities than just Harvard, including other Ivy League schools and West Coast schools like Stanford University and the University of California, Berkeley.

Its first clubhouse was located in a two-story Victorian manse at 722 Sutter Street near Taylor Street, in the Union Square district and just around the corner from the Bohemian Club and the Olympic Club. Like most clubs of its time, membership was limited to men, and any proposed member had to have completed at least two years at university, which was somewhat uncommon at the time. The facility included a private dining room, a forum for after-dinner speakers, and guestrooms.

The Club quickly outgrew the Sutter Street building and, in 1903, Club President William Bowers Bourn II hired architect Willis Polk to design a new clubhouse at the corner of Sutter and Van Ness Streets. Before the plans could be developed or the site purchased, however, the Sutter Street clubhouse was destroyed by fire in the 1906 San Francisco earthquake. For the next two years, the Club rented and occupied temporary locations.

In 1908, the Club purchased a lot atop Nob Hill at what is now 800 Powell Street, on the northeast corner of California Street, across from the Fairmont Hotel at the intersection of the two lines of the San Francisco cable car system. It previously had been the location of the mansion of Leland Stanford, which also had been destroyed in the earthquake. There, the Club built a new four-story brick Italianate-style clubhouse, designed by the local firm of Bliss & Faville, who also designed the Westin St. Francis Hotel, the Southern Pacific Building, and portions of the 1915 Panama–Pacific International Exposition. The new clubhouse devoted the second floor, and part of the first, to guestrooms. The third floor contained a restaurant and bar, and the fourth floor contained a bar, library and other rooms.  The Club also obtained the site of Stanford's former stables, situated just east of the Clubhouse. There, in the early 1970s, it constructed its athletic facilities, including singles and doubles squash courts.

In 1988, under pressure from anti-discrimination lawsuits and judicial trends, the University Club agreed to accept women as members.

The Club today
Membership in the University Club is extended by invitation only, and is limited by its by-laws to no more than 500 members.  The Club has reciprocal membership privileges with over 400 clubs worldwide.

Notable members
 William Bowers Bourn II
 Luther Burbank
 Peter Folger
 Herbert Hoover
 David Starr Jordan
 William Keith
 John Muir
 Michael O'Shaughnessy
 James D. Phelan
 Benjamin Ide Wheeler

See also
 List of traditional gentlemen's clubs in the United States

References

External links
Official website

Clubs and societies in the United States
Gentlemen's clubs in California
1890 establishments in California
Organizations based in the San Francisco Bay Area
Buildings and structures burned in the 1906 San Francisco earthquake